The Blood Doctor is a novel by British writer Ruth Rendell, written under the pseudonym Barbara Vine.

References

External links 
Review from The Guardian
Review from The Observer
Review from MysteryInk
Interview with The Guardian from time of publication
Reviewof the Audiobook version from The Guardian

2002 British novels
Novels by Ruth Rendell
Medical novels
House of Lords
Works published under a pseudonym
Viking Press books